Jeppe Riddervold (born May 31, 1976) is a Danish songwriter, entrepreneur, and music publisher. He is the CEO of JAM Company.

Biography
Born in Farsø, Denmark, Jeppe Riddervold founded JAM Company, headquartered in Copenhagen in 2009 and is the CEO of the company. In 2014 Riddervold founded Jelly Animation Sound Studios, a sound facility specialising in creating music and sound design for the Animation TV and Film Industry. www.jellybyjam.com

As a result of his work as musical director on the hit TV series Ninjago, Riddervold was nominated in for Outstanding Achievement for Music in an Animated Television / Broadcast Production at the 2014 annual Annie Awards. He is a two time BMI Music Award winner as well as Nominated at the 2017 Daytime Emmy Awards.

In 2017, Riddervold's newest addition to the JAM Company, SoulJAM Publishing signed american singer and writer Maya B and Swedish writer producer, Olle Markensten.

Jeppe Riddervold was a songwriter with SonyATV/ EMI music publishing in Nashville, Tennessee for almost a decade, during which time he worked with artists, AnR and songwriters including Keith Urban, Lady Antebellum, John Paul White (The civil wars), Keifer and Shawna Thompson (Thompson Square), Rascal Flatts, Robin Lee Bruce, Cory Mayo, Jeff Spence, Arlis Albritton, and record labels Universal Music, EMI Music, Warner Music, EMI Nashville, SonyBMG and Chrysalis Nashville. He also worked with producers Trey Bruce, Larry Beaird, Chris Lord-Alge, Gary O', Edsel Dope, Lene Marlin, Neil Thomas, Hooverphonic, Theerd Bomhoff (singer of Voicst) and others.

In 2003, Jeppe Riddervold won the 'EMI Germany Songwriter of the Year 2003' for the song 'Survive', which was co-written with Bart Mendoza.

Discography
Selected releases (singer or band member):

 ’Kill me on a Friday’ 2010, TV2/Digidi, The JAM band, band member.

 ’Good times’ 2011, JAM records, The JAM band, band member.

 ’The boys, the beers, the party’, 2011, The JAM band, backing vocals

 ’The weekend whip', The Fold, 2011, Lego Ninjago title song, backing vocals
Selected releases as contributing lead singer: 
 ATB ’Trilogy’ 2007 on ’Some things just are the way they are’ and ’these days’.

Selected releases as studio musician:

 ’Survive’, Daniel Hall, US, Universal Music album System Overload. Guitar, backing vocals.

 ’Drive, Daniel Hall, US, Universal Music album System Overload. Guitar, backing vocals.

 ’On my own’ 1995 EP, record label ’Starsound’ (now BMG). Guitar, backing vocals.

 ’Kill me on a Friday’ 2010, TV2/Digidi, The JAM band, band member. Guitar, keyboard, backing vocals, bass.

 ’Good times’ 2011, JAM records, The JAM band, band member, backing vocals.

 ’The boys, the beers, the party’, 2011, The JAM band. Backing vocals.

 ’The weekend whip', The Fold, 2011, Lego Ninjago title song. Backing vocals and bass.
Selected releases as a songwriter:

 ’Survive’ The Shambles, US, 2004, written together with Bart Mendoza Winner of EMI Germany Songwriter of the year 2003

 ’Survive’, Daniel Hall, US, Universal Music album System Overload.

 ’Drive, Daniel Hall, US, Universal Music album System Overload.

 ’Kill me on a Friday’ 2010, TV2/Digidi, The JAM band.

 ’Good times’ 2011, JAM Records, The JAM band.

 ’The boys, the beers, the party’, 2011, The JAM band.

 Julie ’Asasara’ 2007 ’Take me away’ and ’When we fall in love again’.

 Julie ’Lige nu’ 2009 ’Alt hvad et hjerte kan bære’ og ’Du & jeg’.

 Nikolaj & piloterne ’Mand’, ’Tro, håb og kærlighed’.

 The Fold, ’The weekend whip’ (single) 2011.

References

External links
Jeppe Riddervold official website
JAM Company official website

Danish male singer-songwriters
Danish record producers
People from Vesthimmerland Municipality
1976 births
Living people
21st-century Danish male singers